The 2019 Nigerian Senate election in Anambra State was held on February 23, 2019, to elect members of the Nigerian Senate to represent Anambra State. Stella Oduah representing Anambra North and Uche Ekwunife representing Anambra Central won on the platform of Peoples Democratic Party while Ifeanyi Ubah representing Anambra South on the platform of Young Progressives Party.

Overview

Summary

Results

Anambra South 
A total of 26 candidates registered with the Independent National Electoral Commission to contest in the election. YPP candidate Patrick Ifeanyi Ubah won the election, defeating PDP candidate Chris Ubah and 24 other party candidates. Ifeanyi Ubah scored 87,081 votes, while  PDP candidate, Chris Ubah scored 52,462 votes and APC candidate Andy Ubah scored 13,245.

Anambra North 
A total of 21 candidates registered with the Independent National Electoral Commission to contest in the election. PDP candidate Stella Oduah won the election, defeating APGA candidate Chinedu Emeka and 19 other party candidates. Oduah pulled  113,989 votes, while APGA candidate Chinedu Emeka scored  59,937.

Anambra Central 
A total of 28 candidates registered with the Independent National Electoral Commission to contest in the election. PDP candidate Uche Ekwunife won the election, defeating APGA candidate, Victor Umeh. Ekwunife pulled 118,484 votes while his closest rival Umeh pulled 81,429 votes.

References 

Anambra State senatorial elections
2019 Anambra State elections